Ensign P. Dickinson (May 26, 1819 – October 10, 1897) was a member of the Wisconsin State Assembly.

Biography
Dickinson was born on May 26, 1819 in Johnston Township, Trumbull County, Ohio. He moved to Platteville, Wisconsin in 1844. He died on October 10, 1897.

Career
Dickinson was a member of the Assembly in 1883. Additionally, he was Treasurer, Assessor and Chairman of the Board of Platteville. He was a Republican.

References

People from Trumbull County, Ohio
People from Platteville, Wisconsin
Mayors of places in Wisconsin
Republican Party members of the Wisconsin State Assembly
1819 births
1897 deaths
19th-century American politicians